Melora Hardin (born June 29, 1967) is an American actress, known for her roles as Jan Levinson on NBC's The Office and Trudy Monk on USA Network's Monk, and Tammy Cashman on Amazon Prime Video's Transparent, for which she received a Primetime Emmy Award nomination. Hardin starred as magazine editor-in-chief Jacqueline Carlyle on the Freeform comedy-drama The Bold Type, which aired from June 2017 to June 2021.

Early life
Hardin was born in Houston, Texas, the daughter of acting manager, coach, and retired actress Diane (née Hill) and actor Jerry Hardin. She is the sister of former Flock CEO Shawn Hardin. She moved to San Francisco, California at age five and later attended middle and high school in the San Fernando Valley at Patrick Henry Junior High School and Ulysses S. Grant High School, respectively. She graduated from Sarah Lawrence College.

Career

1976–1999
Hardin started her acting career as the young star of the television series Thunder (1977–1978), and has appeared in over 70 movies and television programs since, including episode 39 of The Love Boat in 1978, two episodes of the medical drama Quincy, M. E. (as Amanda in the 1979 episode "Never a Child" and as Abagail "Abby" Garvin in the infamous 1982 anti-punk rock episode "Next Stop, Nowhere"), two 1981 Little House on the Prairie episodes (as Belinda Stevens in "The Reincarnation of Nellie", Parts 1 and 2) as well as playing Michele Pierson in the 1983 television movie Little House: Look Back to Yesterday. Hardin appeared as Whitney Dunbar, opposite C. Thomas Howell, in the 1986 film, Soul Man. She starred as Baby in the short-lived 1988 television series Dirty Dancing (based on the 1987 film of the same name) and two 1992 episodes of Quantum Leap (as Abigail in "Trilogy", Parts 2 and 3). She co-starred in the 1990 dance movie Lambada as Sandy. She appeared in Absolute Power (1997) as Christy Sullivan and played Ross's dirty-talking love interest in the season 1 Friends episode "The One with the Stoned Guy".

She was also originally cast in Back to the Future (1985) as Jennifer Parker alongside Eric Stoltz, who starred as Marty McFly. Stoltz was fired shortly after filming began and was replaced with Michael J. Fox. Hardin was deemed too tall to star alongside Fox, and she was later replaced by Claudia Wells.

Hardin played a nightclub singer in Disney's The Rocketeer (1991), where she can be heard singing "Begin the Beguine". She also played a major role in the TV movie Tower of Terror, where she sings "Boy of My Dreams".

2000–present
Hardin starred in the 2000–2001 series Cover Me: Based on the True Life of an FBI Family, and she played the recurring role of Trudy Monk, the title character's deceased wife, on the USA Network series Monk (2004-2009). She appeared on the series NCIS as former Petty Officer Erin Toner in the episode "The Curse". In 2005, Hardin portrayed Linda Evans in Dynasty: The Making of a Guilty Pleasure, a fictionalized television movie based on the creation and behind the scenes production of the 1980s primetime soap opera Dynasty. Hardin played Jan Levinson in The Office (2005–2013), a former corporate manager and love interest of Michael Scott.

Hardin appeared in the 2006 film Thank You for Smoking, and appears in Hannah Montana: The Movie as the love interest of Billy Ray Cyrus's character. The film premiered on April 10, 2009. She played the role of Fantine in the Hollywood Bowl's concert of Les Misérables in Summer 2008. Hardin appeared in several episodes of the popular web show Elevator on YouTube.

Hardin made her Broadway debut as Roxie Hart in the revival of Chicago: The Musical on December 29, 2008. She stayed with the show until February 12, 2009. Also in 2009, Hardin was cast as Principal Jane Masterson in the popular comedy film 17 Again. Hardin was cast as a major character in Outlaw, playing a powerful senior partner of an elite law firm, and the main love interest to the series' protagonist, played by Jimmy Smits. Hardin played the role of Isabelle Palmer's mother Nancy in An American Girl: Isabelle Dances Into the Spotlight.

Hardin sang the U.S. national anthem at the Anaheim Ducks’ season opening hockey game on October 13, 2010, and did the same for the Phoenix Coyotes three days later. She also sang the anthem at the Dover International Speedway for the AAA 400 on October 2, 2011.

Hardin sang the song "Tiers of Joy" (composed by Austin Wintory) for the Leisure Suit Larry: Reloaded soundtrack.

In September 2021, Hardin was announced as one of the celebrities competing on season 30 of Dancing with the Stars. She and her professional dance partner, Artem Chigvintsev, made it to the semifinals and ultimately finished in 6th place.

Personal life
Hardin has been married to actor Gildart Jackson since 1997. They have two daughters, Rory and Piper.

Filmography

Film

Television

References

External links

 
 
 
 
 

1967 births
Living people
Actresses from Houston
Actresses from San Francisco
Sarah Lawrence College alumni
20th-century American actresses
21st-century American actresses
American child actresses
American women singers
American film actresses
American television actresses
American musical theatre actresses
Melora Hardin
Grant High School (Los Angeles) alumni
Traditional pop music singers